The Muskoday Bridge is a Canadian traffic bridge that spans the South Saskatchewan River dividing the Muskoday First Nation reserve; the bridge was completed on October 21, 1970. The bridge carries Saskatchewan Highway 3 linking Prince Albert, Saskatchewan with Birch Hills, Saskatchewan.

See also 
 List of crossings of the South Saskatchewan River
 List of bridges in Canada

References 

Road bridges in Saskatchewan
Bridges over the South Saskatchewan River
Bridges completed in 1970